The 1991–92 Essex Senior Football League season was the 21st in the history of Essex Senior Football League a football competition in England.

League table

The league featured 15 clubs which competed in the league last season, along with two new clubs:
Basildon United, resigned from the Isthmian League
Concord Rangers, joined from the Essex Intermediate League

League table

References

Essex Senior Football League seasons
1991–92 in English football leagues